Toni Kinshofer (16 February 1934 – 24 October 1964) was a German mountaineer.

In 1961, on an expedition led by Toni Hiebeler, he undertook the first winter ascent of the Eiger North Face with Walter Almberger and Anderl Mannhardt. At 27, Kinshofer was the senior climber of the team (Mannhardt the youngest at 21). Kinshofer did most of the leading throughout during their epic, six-day (6–12 March) climb.

On 23 June 1962 Kinshofer was one of three climbers on the German team to reach the summit of Nanga Parbat in Pakistan, (via the very steep Diamir Face) for its second ascent, with Sigi Löw and Anderl Mannhardt. They had to bivy above 8,000 m on the way down. His climbing partner Loew fell to his death, and Mannhardt and Kinshofer had to have toes and/or feet amputated. The route is named the Kinshofer route and is still a major undertaking.

Kinshofer died in a fall in the climbing area of Battert near Baden-Baden in the Black Forest in 1964.

References

 Hiebeler, Toni, North Face in Winter by Toni Hiebeler, Lippincott 1963.

1931 births
1964 deaths
German mountain climbers
Mountaineering deaths
Sport deaths in Germany
Deaths from falls
German amputees